Cool Spring Farm — also known as Rockdale Spring Farm and  Torytown — was a wilderness estate settled by Colonel Morgan Morgan (1688-1766), long celebrated as the first permanent European settler in what would become West Virginia. The Welsh-born Morgan was granted  here in 1735, but he is believed to have first settled there in 1731.  Recent research indicates that Morgan's settlement was not the first, but was preceded by a German settlement at what became "New Mecklinberg", possibly as early as 1726.

Morgan Morgan's seventh son, Zackquill Morgan (1735-1795), built the house in 1761, but sold the farm in 1765 and moved west to Monongalia County, Virginia, now West Virginia, to establish his namesake settlement of Morgantown in 1781.

After changing hands several times, the property was purchased by John McKown, Jr. in 1827.  His son Edmund renamed the farm "Rockdale Spring Farm". The sons of John McKown owned considerable lands in the area of Gerrardstown during the late 19th century.

See also
 Cool Spring Farm (Charles Town, West Virginia)

References

Farms on the National Register of Historic Places in West Virginia
Federal architecture in West Virginia
Georgian architecture in West Virginia
Houses completed in 1761
Houses in Berkeley County, West Virginia
Houses on the National Register of Historic Places in West Virginia
Morgan family of West Virginia
National Register of Historic Places in Berkeley County, West Virginia
Colonial architecture in West Virginia